Zieria collina  commonly known as hill zieria, is a plant in the citrus family, Rutaceae and is endemic to a small area in south-east Queensland. It is a large, spreading shrub with leaves composed of three leaflets, and small flowers with four white petals.

Description
The upper surface of the leaflets is a darker shade of green than the lower surface and usually has a few hairs and tubercles while the lower surface in densely covered with velvety hairs. The sepal have four lobes and there are four petals. In common with other zierias, there are only four stamens. Flowering mainly occurs from August to October but flowers are often seen at other times. Fruit opens about six weeks after flowering.<ref name="BRAIN">{{cite web|title=Zieria collina|url=http://www.brisrain.org.au/01_cms/details.asp?ID=592|publisher=Brisbane Rainforest Action and Information Network|access-date=24 October 2016}}</ref>

Taxonomy and namingZieria collina was first formally described in 1932 by Cyril Tenison White and the description was published in Proceedings of the Royal Society of Queensland. The specific epithet (collina) is a Latin word meaning "of a hill". New South Wales Flora Online features a photo of the Herbarium Sheet.

Distribution and habitat
This zieria grows near the edge of rainforest on and near Tamborine Mountain. It sometimes forms dense thickets and seems to respond to disturbance.

ConservationZieria collina is classified as "Vulnerable" under the Commonwealth Government Environment Protection and Biodiversity Conservation Act 1999 (EPBC) Act. The main threat to its survival is invasion by introduced species, especially lantana (Lantana camara'').

References 

collina
Sapindales of Australia
Flora of New South Wales
Plants described in 1932